Reflections is a 1984 British drama film directed by Kevin Billington and starring Gabriel Byrne, Donal McCann and Fionnula Flanagan. The film is an adaptation for the British broadcaster Channel 4 of the 1982 novel The Newton Letter by John Banville, who also wrote the screenplay.

The budget was £502,000.

Plot
The film follows the adventures of an aspiring biographer of Isaac Newton who rents a rural retreat in the south of Ireland to write an in-depth treatment of an obscure and disturbing letter Newton sent in 1693 to John Locke. He becomes involved with two women: Ottilie Garinger and her aunt, Charlotte. The presence of Charlotte's husband, Edward Lawless, creates a romantic triangle-plus-one.

Cast
 Gabriel Byrne as William Masters
 Donal McCann as Edward Lawless
 Fionnula Flanagan as Mrs. Charlotte Lawless
 Harriet Walter as Ottilie Garinger
 Gerard Cummins as Michael Lawless
 Niall Toibin as Mr. Prunty
 Peadar Lamb as Doctor
 Des Nealon as Tom Mittler
 Margaret Wade as Bunny Mittler 
 Larry O'Driscoll as Rat Man
 Noel O'Flaherty as Rat Man

References

External links
 

1984 films
1984 drama films
British drama films
Cultural depictions of Isaac Newton
1980s English-language films
Films based on Irish novels
Films directed by Kevin Billington
Films with screenplays by John Banville
1980s British films